The 1951 Furman Purple Hurricane football team was an American football team that represented Furman University as a member of the Southern Conference (SoCon) during the 1951 college football season. Led by second-year head coach Bill Young, the Purple Hurricane compiled an overall record of 3–6–1 with a mark of 1–4–1 in conference play, placing 15th in the SoCon.

Schedule

References

Furman
Furman Paladins football seasons
Furman Purple Hurricane football